The 2018–19 Ukrainian Second League was the 28th since its establishment. The competition started on 21 July 2018 with the match between Myr and FC Nikopol.

The competition entered in recess for a winter break which started after the completion of Round 17 on 11 November 2018 and resumed on 31 March 2019. The season competitions were scheduled to be completed on 1 June 2019 (later ending on 25 May 2019 due to reduction of participants) culminating with a two legged play-off for promotion held between the two second place from both groups and the 13th and 14th placed teams from the 2018–19 Ukrainian First League on 29 May and 2 June 2019.

Format
The PFL composition of the league was approved at the PFL Conference on 27 June 2017, yet the final composition with the competition regulations will be approved later by the FFU Executive Committee.

The competition is conducted in a triple round robin format. The PFL reinstated direct promotion and relegation between the Second League and the Ukrainian Amateur Football Championship. Some other administrative changes will be introduced for the season in Second League, such as names on jerseys, the PFL emblem, others. In addition, the FFU approved a list of stadiums for each league.

Each winner of group earns a direct promotion, while each runner will contest additional promotion with 13th/14th places of the First League. In case of the Ukrainian Premier League expansion for the next season, winners and second placed teams will get direct promotion, while in play-off will participate third placed teams.

One team from each group with the worst record will be relegated. Those two teams will be swapped with four teams from the Ukrainian Amateur Football Championship.

Teams

Promoted teams
The final composition of the league was adopted at the PFL Conference on 27 June 2018. In the midst of the previous season some several amateur teams expressed their intention to play in Druha Liha. The following teams have been admitted from the 2017–18 Ukrainian Football Amateur League:
 Chaika Petropavlivska Borshchahivka – 5th place of Group 2 (debut) 
 Hirnyk Kryvyi Rih – 5th place of Group 3 (returning after an absence of five seasons) 
 Metalurh Zaporizhya – 4th place of Group 3 (debut, a club with the same name competed last season) 
 FC Kalush – 5th place of Group 1 (returning after an absence of thirteen seasons) 
 Krystal Kherson – 2nd place of Group 3 (returning after an absence of a season after reorganization) 
 FC Mynai – 1st place of Group 1 (debut)

Relegated teams 
There were two teams relegated from the 2017–18 Ukrainian First League:
 Kremin Kremenchuk – 16th place (returning after an absence of a season)
 Cherkaskyi Dnipro – 17th place (returning after an absence of three seasons), later dissolved and reorganized as FC Cherkashchyna-Akademiya Bilozirya

Swapped teams 
 Veres Rivne – 6th place of the 2017–18 Ukrainian Premier League (returning after an absence of two seasons). The club passed attestation and assumed the position in the league instead of FC Lviv and returned to Rivne Oblast.

Renamed/reformed teams 
 FC Cherkaskyi Dnipro was dissolved in July 2018, and reorganized as FC Cherkashchyna-Akademiya Bilozirya based on its academy from Bilozirya assumed the place of Cherkaskyi Dnipro in the Second League instead.
 FC Nyva-V Vinnytsia renamed themselves back to their former name FC Nyva Vinnytsia.

Expelled/withdrawn teams 
 Naftovyk-Ukrnafta Okhtyrka – passed attestation and even was given opportunity to return to the First League, but Okhtyrka city mayor Ihor Alekseyev confirmed in May that the club was dissolved by its main sponsor Ukrnafta. The final decision about the team participation in the season was announced on 11 July 2018, and the season calendar was published without team from Okhtyrka.
 Arsenal-Kyivshchyna Bila Tserkva – failed attestation
 FC Dnipro – the club failed attestation for the season and were approved by the FIFA Disciplinary Committee to be relegated to a lower classification level due to unpaid old debts
 FC Metalurh Zaporizhzhia – prior to attestation, the club merged with FC Spartak-KPU Zaporizhzhia (a team of local university, KPU), but on 6 June 2018, the club failed attestation for the season and the club's administration decided to dissolve the team
 Inhulets-2 Petrove – the main club's administration of Inhulets Petrove decided to dissolve the second team
 Sudnobudivnyk Mykolaiv – failed attestation
 Skala Stryi – passed attestation, but dissolved its senior team protesting the FFU accusations in gambling. On 14 June 2018, there appeared information that the club will merge its academy with FC Volyn Lutsk.

Location map 
The following map displays the location of teams. Group A teams marked in red. Group B teams marked in green.

Stadiums
Group A
Group B

Notes:

 Chaika although located in Petropavlivska Borshchahivka in Kyiv-Sviatoshyn Raion outside the city limits of Kyiv began the competition playing in Lyutizh, Vyshhorod Raion since their usual home ground, Kozak-Arena was not in a prepared state. From Round 9 the club moved their home matches to Makariv due to the heat affecting players playing on the artificial surface at Dinaz Stadium. 
 Cherkashchyna-Akademiya play their home matches in the Zorya Stadium, located in Bilozirya in Cherkasy Raion near the city of Cherkasy.
  Polissya Zhytomyr continue to play their home games in Novohrad-Volynskyi due to the construction of both Central Stadium and Spartak Stadium Following the winter break the club moved its home games to the Kyiv's suburb Shchaslyve.
 Due to the unavailability of Avanhard Stadium, Veres Rivne play in Mlyniv.
 Tavriya Simferopol continue to play their home matches in Beryslav although they had registered to play at Enerhiya Stadium in Nova Kakhovka. All matches will be played in Kherson Oblast of Ukraine due to the Annexation of Crimea by the Russian Federation

Managers

Managerial changes

Notes:
 After Round 9, Denys Kolchin submitted his resignation  but the President of the club, Vasyl Vovk refused to accept it.
 Ihor Stolovytskyi left Cherkaskyi Dnipro for Kremin prior to the season starting.

Group A

League table

Results

Position by round

Goalscorers 

Notes:

Group B

League table

Results

Position by round

Goalscorers 

Notes:

Post season play-offs 
The second places of each group will play-off for the third promotion for the First League. Later with withdrawal of several clubs, the format changed (see 2018–19 Ukrainian First League#Format). The second place runners-up will play with the Persha Liha thirteenth and fourteenth places, yet with expansion of the UPL those teams will receive direct promotion and the third placed teams will be contesting promotion in play-offs.

Championship game
On 7 May 2019 it was announced that the final game between group winners of the Second League will take place in Kropyvnytskyi.

Kremin Kremenchuk are crowned Champions of the Ukrainian Second League for the 2018–19 season

Notes:

Promotion play-offs

Awards

Monthly awards

Round awards

See also
 2018–19 Ukrainian Premier League
 2018–19 Ukrainian First League
 2018–19 Ukrainian Cup

References

External links
 The 2018–19 calendar plan of the All-Ukrainian competitions in football among teams of the PFL clubs (draft). Professional Football League of Ukraine. adopted on 9 July 2018.

Ukrainian Second League seasons
2018–19 in Ukrainian association football leagues
Ukraine